The Tay Canal is the portion of the Tay River in the eastern Ontario region, providing a connection between the town of Perth and the Rideau Canal at Beveridge Bay on Lower Rideau Lake.

History

First Tay Canal
Proposals to make the Tay into a navigable waterway date to 1824, when local Perth entrepreneur William Morris started to lobby for this.  When the construction of the Rideau Canal started in 1826, Perth business interests hoped that this would include the Tay, but the Superintending Engineer for the Rideau Canal, Lt. Colonel John By had no mandate to build any branch canals.  So it was decided to form a company to build the Tay Canal.  On 16 March 1831, legislation to form the Tay Navigation Company was passed.

In 1831, John Jackson, an ex-Sergeant in the army and a miller in Perth was awarded the contract to build the canal. The route would lead from Perth to the mouth of the Tay River. This was a less expensive option and it was felt that it would accommodate most of the commercial traffic of the day. By the end of 1834, five locks, six dams (with timber slides), two swing bridges and several embankments were built. This became known as the First Tay Canal.

The First Tay Canal was never a commercial success.  Revenues were not sufficient to allow proper maintenance and the condition of the canal deteriorated over the years. In 1865, several of the locks were destroyed by logs and the canal was shut down.

Second Tay Canal
After the demise of the First Tay Canal, a political lobby started to build a new canal.  The Government of Canada had taken over the Tay Navigation Company, and in 1881, they initiated an investigation into making the Tay navigable to Perth. Perth's local member of parliament, John G. Haggart, had some influence in launching this investigation which was carried out by the engineers of the Rideau Canal under the direction of Superintendent Wise.  Two routes were examined, one following the route of the First Tay Canal to Port Elmsley and a second involving a canal cut from Beveridge Bay of Lower Rideau Lake to the Tay River.

To the disappointment of the residents of Port Elmsley, the second route was chosen. In 1883, a Government of Canada Order-in-Council authorized a contract with A.H. Manning & Macdonald Company for the construction of the Tay Canal.

The locks were built to the same design and specifications as the Rideau Canal locks. Started in early 1885, they were completed in 1887. Final excavation of the canal to the required navigation depth and an expansion of the basin in Perth were not completed until 1891.

For a time, the canal from the Beveridges Locks to Perth became known as "Haggart's Ditch".

Tay Today

The Tay Canal is currently operated by Parks Canada as part of their Rideau Canal operations. The locks are in operation from mid-May to mid-October.

The limiting factor for a trip all the way into Perth is the fixed height of the Craig Street bridge. If a vessel is taller than this, the vessel will have to dock at Last Duel Park, a short walk from downtown Perth. Vessel operators should mention this to the lock staff at Beveridges who can advise when the bridge will swing.

References

External links
Friends of the Tay Watershed
175th Anniversary of the Tay Canal (2009)
Celebrating the Tay Canal
The First Tay Canal

Canals in Ontario
Ship canals
National Historic Sites in Ontario
Canals opened in 1834
Canals opened in 1887